Aclima (also Kalmana, Lusia, Cainan, Luluwa, or Awan) according to some religious traditions was the oldest daughter of Adam and Eve, the sister (in many sources, the twin sister) of Cain. This would make her the first female human who was born naturally.

 states that after he had killed Abel, "Cain knew his wife, and she conceived and bore Enoch". In an effort to explain where Cain and Abel acquired wives, some traditional sources stated that each child of Adam and Eve was born with a twin who became their mate.

Aclima and Lusia
In Muslim tradition, Cain was born with a twin sister who was named Aclima, and Abel with a twin sister named Jumella. Adam wished Cain to marry Abel's twin sister, and Abel to marry Cain's. Cain would not consent to this arrangement, and Adam proposed to refer the question to God by means of a sacrifice. God rejected Cain's sacrifice to signify his disapproval of his marriage with Aclima, his twin sister, and Cain slew his brother in a fit of jealousy.

In another Muslim tradition, Cain's twin sister was named Lusia, while Aclima was Abel's twin sister.

In different sources, this name appears as Aclimah, Aclimia, Aclimiah, Klimia. In the Cave of Treasures she is called Qelima.

Kalmana or Calmana
Some sources in the Eastern Orthodox traditions give Cain's twin sister the name Calmana, Calmanna, Azrun, or Azura.

In the Jewish work Seder Hadorot, Cain's twin sister is called Kalmana, and Abel's twin sister called Balbira.

The sister of Cain was named Kalmana in the Apocalypse of Pseudo-Methodius (first Greek redaction) II.1., and Calmana in the Golden Legend. The poet Petrus Riga (1140–1209) included Calmana in his famous poem Aurora, and this could have been a source for her appearance in Peter Comestor's Historia Scholastica. Comestor's Biblical narrative text then served as the standard textbook for Biblical education for centuries.

Cainan
In an Armenian work republished in 1966, Cain's twin sister was named Cainan. This short work does not mention Cain's marriage.

Luluwa

In the 6th-century apocryphal work Conflict of Adam and Eve with Satan, Cain's wife and twin is named Luluwa.

Awan
According to the Book of Jubilees, Awan (also Avan or Aven, from Hebrew אָוֶן aven "vice", "iniquity", "potency") was the wife and sister of Cain and the daughter of Adam and Eve.

See also
Incest in the Bible
List of names for the biblical nameless

References

Children of Adam and Eve
Women in the Old Testament apocrypha
Cain and Abel
Jewish mythology